Dual control can refer either to a concept in government, or a concept in airplane operation:
 Dual control (politics)
 Dual control (aviation)

See also
Dual control stand
Dual control theory
Dual mandate